Jagannath Prasad Das (born 26 April 1936) is an Indian writer, poet,painter, playwright and novelist who writes in Odia.

Life

Starting his career with a brief teaching assignment as assistant professor in the University of Allahabad, he joined the Indian Administrative Service and had held positions in the Government of Odisha and the Central Government. He has chosen to settle down in Delhi after taking premature retirement from Government service and is involved in the cultural and social life of the city where he lives.

Translations and Editing
Besides translating some of his own work in Odia into English, he has also translated other works in different languages into both Odia and English. He has translated Odia Women Poets’ Work into English (with Arlene Zide), Catherine Clement’s poems from French into English (with the poet), Gulzar’s poems from Urdu into English, Swedish poet Werner Aspenstrom’s poems into Odia,  a medieval Odia text Lakshmipurana into English and the poetry of Odia Dalit poet Basudev Sunani into English.

He edited the first ever anthology of Odia Short Stories in English translation. He has edited an anthology of poetry from different Indian languages ( with K.Satchidanandan), and a volume of essays, Films for Children.

Fellowships

Das has been awarded the following Fellowships for research and creative writing:

 Homi Bhabha Fellow  (1979–1981) for research on Pata Paintings of Odisha
 Emeritus Fellow of the Ministry of Culture, Government of India (1994–1996)
 K. K. Birla Foundation Fellowship in Comparative Literature (1996–1998)

Awards

 Vishuva Award from Pajatantra Prachar Samiti – 1976 and 1984
 Odisha Sahitya Akademi Award – 1975 (for Je Jahara Nirjanata) 
 Sahitya Akademi Award – 1990 (for Ahnika). He did not accept the award.
 Sarala Award  – 1998 (for Priya Vidushaka) 
 Nandikar Playwright Award – 2000
 Saraswati Samman – 2006 (for Parikrama)

Books by J P Das in Odia

Odia poetry
 Prathama Purusha – 1971
 Anya sabu Mrtyu – 1976
 Je Jahara Nirjanata – 1979
 Anya Desha Bhinna Samaya – 1982
 Jatrara Prathama Pada – 1988
 Ahnika – 1990
 Sthirachitra – 1991
 Sacharachara – 1994
 Smrtira Sahara – 1995
 Parikrama – 1998
 Asamaya – 2004
 Kabita Samagra – Ink Odisha, Bhubaneswar, -2011

Odia Short Stories
 Bhavanatha O Anyamane – 1982
 Dinacharya – 1983
 Ame Jeunmane – 1986
 Sakshatkara – 1986
 Priya Bidushaka – 1991
 Shesha Paryanta – 1995
 Icchhapatra – 2000
 Indradhanu, Akhi O Kabitara Dirghajibana – 2009

Odia plays

 Suryasta Purbaru – 1977
 Saba Shesha Loka – 1980
 Asangata Nataka – 1981
 Purbaraaga – 1983
 Sundara Das – 1993

Odia novel
 Desha Kala Patra – Prachi Prakashan, Bhubaneswar, 1991

Children's literature (Odia)/nonsense rhymes
 Alimalika – Publication Division, Ministry of I and B, Government of India, 1993
 Alukuchi Malukuchi –  Lark, 1993/Timepass, Bhubaneswar, 1993
 Anabana – Ink Odisha, Bhubaneswar, 2008
 Anamana – Timepass, Bhubaneswar, 2016

Translation into Odia

 Svapna-bichara – 2000

Anthologies of Poetry and Short Stories in Odia
 Chha'ti Jhia – 1987
 Premakabita (poetry) – 1991
 Shreshtha Kabita (poetry) – 1993
 Purbapara-1(Samagra Kabita 1970–79) (poetry) – 1995
 Purbapara-2(Samagra Kabita 1980–94) (poetry) – 1996
 Rangalipi – 1997
 Kathajatra (short stories)- 2000
 Kabita Samagra (poetry) – 2011
 Shreshtha Galpa (short stories)- 2014

 Books by J P Das in English
Research works
 Puri Paintings: The Chitrakara and His Work, Arnold-Heinemann, 1982
 Chitra-Pothi: Illustrated Palm-leaf Manuscripts, Arnold-Heinemann, 1985
 Palm-leaf Miniatures (with Joanna Williams), Abhinav Publications, 1991

Essays
 Reflections on Literature and Culture, Sikshasandhan, 2009

Works edited
 Oriya Short Stories, Vikas Publishing House, 1983
 Films for Children, Vikas Publishing House, 1987
 Kavita 93 (with K. Satchidanandan), Virgo Publications, 1993

Works translated
 Growing an Indian Star (with Catherine Clement), Vikas Publishing House, 1991
 Under a Silent Sun (with Arlene Zide),  Vikas Publishing House, 1992
 Autumn Moon, Rupa Publishing House, 1999

 Books by Das translated into English 
 First Person – Tr: Deba Patnaik, Arnold-Heinemann, 1976
 Love is a Season – Tr: Poet, Arnold-Heinemann, 1978
 Timescapes – Tr: Poet, Arnold-Heinemann, 1980
 Silences – Tr: Poet, Vikas, 1989
 Diurnal Rites – Tr: H. Panda, Sahitya Akademi, 1994
 The Unreal City – Tr: Durga P. Panda, Har Anand, 1997
 Lovelines – Tr: Poet with Paul St-Pierre, Virgo, 2001
 Alimalika – Tr: Poet, Writers Workshop, 2004
 Dark Times – Tr: Poet with Paul St-Pierre, Virgo, 2004
 Poems – Tr: Poet, Grassroots, 2004
 Nanasense – Tr: Sumanyu Satpathy, NBT, 2013

Short stories
 The Magic Deer – Tr: Author, Vikas, 1983
 The Forbidden Street – Tr: Author, Vikas, 1988
 Spider's Web – Tr: KK. & Leelawati Mahapatra, Vikas, 1990
 The Prostitute – Tr: Bibhuti Mishra and others, Har Anand, 1995
 The Pukka Sahib –  Tr: Bikram K Das, Harper Collins, 2001
 Stories – Tr: Paul St-Pierre, Leela and K K Mahapatra, Grassroots, 2003
 Dear Jester – Tr: R K Swain and Paul St-Pierre, Rupa, 2004
 The Will – Tr: Ashok Mohanty, Sahitya Akademi, 2007

Plays

 Before the Sunset – Tr: Author, Arnold-Heinemnn, 1978
 Two Plays –  Tr: Author, Writers Workshop, 1983
 The Underdog –  Tr: Ravi Baswani, Vikas, 1984
 Absurd Play –  Tr: Author, Writers Workshop, 1989
 Sundardas – Tr. Paul St-Pierre and others, NSD and Har Anand, 2002
 Miss X – Tr: Author, Rupa, 2002

Novel
 A Time Elsewhere – Tr: Jatindra K. Nayak, Penguin, 2009

Collections of his works by others
 J. P. Das Omnibus,  Ed: Paul St. Peirre, Har-Anand, 2012
 Complete Plays, Ed: N. K. Bhattacharjee, Har-Anand, 2012
 Selected Short Stories,   Ed: Mauricio Aguilera, Har-Anand, 2013
 Selected Poems,  Har-Anand, 2014

Books on J P Das
 Words on Canvas: J.P.Das and His Work – ed. Ganeswar Mishra (Orissa Lalit Kala Akademi, 2005)
 Srijan Jatra (Odia) – by Ganeswar Mishra (Vidyapuri, Cuttack, 2010)
 Priya JP (Odia) – ed. Sumanyu Satpathy (Shiksha Sandhan, Bhubaneswar, 2011)
 Jagannath Prasad: Bandhutara Aasara (Odia) – ed. Ganeswar Mishra (Timepass, Bhubaneswar, 2013)
 Bahudha (Odia) – by Sumanyu Satpathy, 2014
 "Bharatiyatara Anweshi JAGANNATH PRASAD DAS" (Odia) – Translated and Edited by Dr Rabinarayan Moharana (Lark Books, Bhubaneswar, 2014)
 "Mukhashala" (Odia) – Compiled and Translated by Dr Rabinarayan Moharana (Ink Odisha, Bhubaneswar, 2015)
 "JP JIBANEE" (Odia) – A biography of Dr Jagannath Prasad Das. The book is written by Dr Rabinarayan Moharana and has been published under the auspices of Utkal Sahitya Samaj, Cuttack and by M/s Jagannath Rath, Binod Bihari, Cuttack (Odisha). First Edition : 2019.

References
 Authorspeak, Sahitya Akademi, 2006 pages 105-110
 Going Through Hells, Muse India, Issue 5, Jan–Feb 2006
 The World of J.P.Das – by Sachidananda Mohanty, The Hindu, March 4, 2007
 JP Revisited – by Ashok Choudhury, Creative Mind, Vol V, 2008
 Out of Orissa – by Humra Quraishi, Sunday Tribune, April 18, 2010
 Taking Stock – by Suresh Kohli, The Hindu, February 4, 2012
 The Measure of Life – by Jitendranath Mishra, The Nation, Bangkok,  March 26, 2012
 Indian Literature: An Introduction – Delhi University, page 315

Videos
 Documentary on J.P.Das, Sahitya Akademi  (30 minutes)
 Jaipur Literature Festival, January 22, 2011  (discussion on A Time Elsewhere)
 Think Literature, Bhubaneswar, December 24, 2013

1936 births
Living people
People from Puri
Odia-language writers
Odia short story writers
Recipients of the Saraswati Samman Award
Writers from Odisha
Recipients of the Sahitya Akademi Award in Odia
Recipients of the Odisha Sahitya Akademi Award
20th-century Indian poets
20th-century Indian novelists
20th-century Indian short story writers
20th-century Indian dramatists and playwrights